Major General Clark W. LeMasters Jr. is a serving general officer in the United States Army and serves as the 35th Commanding General of the U.S. Army Tank-automotive and Armaments Command Life Cycle Management Command. Previously, he served as the 36th Chief of Ordnance for the U.S. Army and Commandant of the United States Army Ordnance School at Fort Lee, Virginia.

Military education
LeMasters was commissioned as a second lieutenant in 1982 from the ROTC program at Marion Military Institute in Marion, Alabama. Following his graduation from Marion, he served in the 1st Regiment, 115th Infantry Battalion, Maryland Army National Guard until he completed his bachelor's degree in Chemistry at Frostburg State University, Frostburg, Maryland. He was assessed to active duty in September 1984 as an Ordnance Officer.

LeMasters has earned a master's degree from the Florida Institute of Technology and the Army War College. His military education includes the Ordnance Officer Basic and Advanced Courses, the Army Command and General Staff College, and the Army War College.

Military career
LeMasters began his career in a series of junior officer assignments in 1985; including, Maintenance Control Officer for the Main Support Battalion for the 1st Infantry Division at Fort Riley, Kansas, Materiel Management Officer for the U.S. Army Missile Command at Redstone Arsenal, Alabama, and Maintenance Manager for Division Support Command for the 8th Infantry Division (Mechanized) in Germany. These junior officer assignments culminated with his assignment as the commander of Delta Company for the 123rd Main Support Battalion (Mechanized) for the 1st Armored Division stationed in Germany in 1991.

After serving as a staff officer with the 47th Support Battalion, 1st Armored Division, LeMasters was assigned as a Logistics Staff Officer for the Force Development and Evaluation Directorate at the U.S. Army Combined Arms Support Command at Fort Lee, Virginia in 1995. Following this assignment, he served as the Support Operations Officer for the 703rd Main Support Battalion and Executive Officer for the 1st Armored Division Support Command in Germany. In 2002, he assumed command of the 123rd Main Support Battalion (Mechanized) for the 1st Armored Division.

Following battalion command, LeMasters was assigned as the Chief of the Logistics Readiness Center at U.S. Central Command and then, Director, Distribution Management Center for the U.S. Army Sustainment Command at Rock Island Arsenal, Illinois. In 2009, he was selected as the Executive Officer to the Deputy Chief of Staff, G-4, of the U.S. Army.

In 2010, LeMasters was selected to become the 36th Chief of Ordnance and Commandant of the U.S. Army Ordnance School. During this assignment, he was promoted to Brigadier General.

Following his tour as Chief of Ordnance, LeMasters was selected to command the 13th Sustainment Command (Expeditionary) based at Fort Hood, Texas in 2012. During this assignment, he was promoted to Major General.

After LeMasters' two-year tour as the Deputy Chief of Staff for Logistics and Operations for the U.S. Army Materiel Command at Redstone Arsenal, Alabama, LeMasters assumed command of the U.S. Army Tank-automotive and Armaments Command in 2016.

LeMasters has served multiple tours with both Operation Enduring Freedom and Operation Iraqi Freedom.

Awards and decorations

References

Year of birth missing (living people)
Living people
United States Army generals
Marion Military Institute alumni
United States Army War College alumni